Rennes station (French: Gare de Rennes) is situated in the town centre of Rennes, France. It is situated on the Paris–Brest, Rennes–Saint-Malo and the Rennes–Redon railways.

The station at Rennes was opened in 1857, and was situated a significant walking distance from the city centre. However, since that date the town has expanded and now the station lies in the central part of the city. It has access to Paris on the TGV, a two-hour trip; and serves Brittany with regular trains to Brest, Lannion, Nantes, Quimper and Saint-Malo. Train service is available to other cities in France such as Lyon, Montpellier, Marseille, Lille, Aix-en-Provence and Strasbourg. The station also has a direct train service to Brussels-South railway station once every day.

It is served by the Gares station of both lines of the Rennes Metro.

Train Services
The station is served by high speed trains to Quimper, Brest and Paris, and regional trains to Quimper, Lorient, Nantes, Laval, Saint-Malo, Saint-Brieuc and Granville.

Public Transport Services
The station is served by Lines A and B of the Rennes Metro. It is also served by several bus lines: C1, C2, 11, 12, and 63.

See also
 Transportation in France

References

External links
 

Buildings and structures in Rennes
Railway stations in Ille-et-Vilaine
TER Bretagne
Railway stations in France opened in 1857